The traditional Korean color spectrum, also known as Obangsaek (means five-orientation-color), is the color scheme of the five Korean traditional colors of white, black, blue, yellow and red. In Korean traditional arts and traditional textile patterns, the colors of Obangsaek represent five cardinal directions: Obangsaek theory is a combination of Five Elements and Five Colours theory and originated in China.

Five orientations
 Blue: east
 Red: south
 Yellow: center
 White: west
 Black: north

These colors are also associated with the Five Elements of traditional Korean culture:

 Blue: Wood
 Red: Fire
 Yellow: Earth
 White: Metal
 Black: Water

References

Color
Optical spectrum
Vision
Korean culture
Korean art
Korean clothing
Orientation (geometry)